Springdale Township is a civil township of Manistee County in the U.S. state of Michigan. The population was 781 at the 2010 census.

Geography

Communities
Bec Scies was a settlement in Springdale Township established in 1881.

Demographics
As of the census of 2000, there were 730 people, 324 households, and 215 families residing in the township.  The population density was 20.5 per square mile (7.9/km).  There were 567 housing units at an average density of 15.9 per square mile (6.1/km).  The racial makeup of the township was 97.67% White, 1.23% Native American, 0.55% from other races, and 0.55% from two or more races. Hispanic or Latino of any race were 2.19% of the population.

There were 324 households, out of which 24.7% had children under the age of 18 living with them, 51.9% were married couples living together, 10.5% had a female householder with no husband present, and 33.6% were non-families. 28.4% of all households were made up of individuals, and 11.7% had someone living alone who was 65 years of age or older.  The average household size was 2.25 and the average family size was 2.72.

In the township the population was spread out, with 21.6% under the age of 18, 6.4% from 18 to 24, 24.9% from 25 to 44, 29.7% from 45 to 64, and 17.3% who were 65 years of age or older.  The median age was 43 years. For every 100 females, there were 104.5 males.  For every 100 females age 18 and over, there were 100.0 males.

The median income for a household in the township was $29,417, and the median income for a family was $31,667. Males had a median income of $31,563 versus $22,500 for females. The per capita income for the township was $16,612.  About 13.6% of families and 22.2% of the population were below the poverty line, including 48.6% of those under age 18 and 9.8% of those age 65 or over.

References

Notes

Sources

Townships in Manistee County, Michigan
Townships in Michigan